The Walsh Street police shootings were the 1988 murders of two Victoria Police officers: Constables Steven Tynan, 22, and Damian Eyre, 20.

Tynan and Eyre were responding to a report of an abandoned car when they were gunned down about 4:50am in Walsh Street, South Yarra (a Melbourne suburb), on 12 October 1988.

Four men, Victor Peirce, Trevor Pettingill, Anthony Leigh Farrell and Peter David McEvoy, were charged with murder and later acquitted by a jury in the Supreme Court of Victoria. Two other suspects, Jedd Houghton and Gary Abdallah, were shot and killed by Victoria Police before being brought to trial.

During 2005, Wendy Peirce, widow of Victor, gave an interview to the mass media. In this interview, she stated that her late husband had planned and carried out the murders and that he was actually guilty as charged.

Background
Since the 1878 attack on three police officers by the Ned Kelly Gang, criminal attacks on police officers were considered as rare events in Victoria. During the period of the 1980s, prior to the Walsh Street killings, there had been a number of random acts of violence committed against members of the Victoria Police. In the early hours of 22 November 1984, officers, Sergeant Peter Kearon, 34, and his partner, Constable Graham Fletcher, operating a divisional van, were conducting license checks in the vehicles on Beach Road in Beaumaris. At 1:35am, Kearon and Fletcher stopped a blue and white 1966 Holden with a missing headlight, as the vehicle pulled alongside the officers' divisional van, the driver got out and fired three shots at Kearon and Fletcher with a .223 Leader carbine semiautomatic assault rifle. The gunman then got back in his vehicle and took off, leading Kearon and Fletcher on a short chase along Beach Road, before turning into Tramway Parade and coming to a stop on Oak Street near the Gibbs Street intersection. The gunman then got out of the Holden and fired three more shots at Kearon and Fletcher's divisional van. Kearon received a cut above his eye from flying glass from the van's shattered windshield, while Fletcher escaped injury by taking cover under the van's dashboard. The gunman, 19-year-old Kai "Matty" Korhonen, was a former army recruit from Clayton who was recently dismissed from his job at a car yard, an hour before shooting at Sergeant Kearon and Constable Fletcher. Korhonen shot and killed security guard Peter Poole outside of the Boral Melwire factory in South Clayton. After shooting at Kearon and Fletcher, Korhonen took off on foot, cutting across nearby Banksia Reserve back towards Tramway Parade. In Tramway Parade, Korhonen opened fire on an unmarked patrol car, containing Senior Constable Ron Fenton, 28, and his partner, Senior Constable Paul Gilbert, 26, from Caulfield police station, who were on the lookout for the gunman responsible for Poole's murder. Senior Constable Gilbert received wounds from bullet fragments to his back, while Senior Constable Fenton received a wound to the back of his head for which, had to undergo neurosurgery and placed in a medical coma for ten days, before making a recovery. Korhonen was later convicted for Poole's murder and the attempted murders of Senior Constables Gilbert and Fenton, Constable Fletcher and Sergeant Kearon and was sentenced to 88 years' imprisonment, he was released after serving 15 years.

On the night of 18 June 1985, two officers, Constable Peter Steele, 26, and his partner, Sergeant Brian Stooke, 40, were sitting in an unmarked patrol car outside of a warehouse in Cheltenham where a burglary had occurred days earlier. At 12:03am on 19 June, they spotted a yellow Ford Cortina circling the street several times outside the warehouse. Thinking it was a burglar, Sergeant Stooke and Constable Steele followed the vehicle and pulled it over and begun to conduct an inspection of the vehicle. A check revealed that the vehicle was registered to a man named Max Clark. As the officers were conducting the inspection, the driver got out of the vehicle and produced a firearm and had shot both officers, wounding them. Constable Steele received a wound to his hand, while Sergeant Stooke was hit four times, one which severed his spinal cord. The gunman then got back in the vehicle and fled from the scene. The gunman then drove to his home where he grabbed more firearms and ammunition before leaving his home in a second vehicle, a green Ford Fairlane. At 3 am, three hours after shooting Stooke and Steele, the gunman's Fairlane was spotted by a patrol car in Oakleigh, operated by Sergeant Ray Kirkwood and Constable Graeme Sayce, resulting in a high-speed chase. At speeds of 180 km/h, the Fairlane's engine blew, rendering the vehicle inoperable. The gunman then took off on foot with Sergeant Kirkwood and Constable Sayce in pursuit. Cornered, the gunman then produced two firearms and opened fire on Kirkwood and Sayce. In the volley of shots fired by the gunman, two went through the patrol car's windshield, hitting and wounding Sergeant Kirkwood.

Thirty minutes later, the gunman shot police dog handler, Senior Constable Gary Morrell, only to be saved by his police-issued ballistic vest. Further police checks revealed that the gunman, Max Clark's real name, Pavel Vasilof Marinof. Born 20 September 1946 in Bulgaria, Marinof had previously served in the Bulgarian Army. In 1967, Marinof deserted from his army unit and fled to Turkey. In 1969, Marinof immigrated to Australia, settling in the South Clayton area. In 1975, Marinof became a naturalized citizen and changed his name to Max Clark. In a raid on Marinof's home, police recovered firearms, several rounds of ammunition along with several items, including petty cash stolen by Marinof in the months prior to the shootings. As Marinof had ties to the Eastern European community, police begun their manhunt in the suburb of Noble Park, known for Melbourne's large Eastern European population, including migrants from Yugoslavia and Macedonia. As the tactics used in the manhunt for Marinof was causing concerns and attracting criticism from the Eastern European community, the manhunt team included Detective Sergeant John "Kappa" Kapetanovski, who was a fluent speaker in both Macedonian and Yugoslav languages, to establish a public trust between police and the Eastern European community.

Marinof (dubbed in the media as Mad Max) went on a crime spree, committing various robberies and thefts in which he stole a machine gun and several rounds of ammunition from an army base. In a public appeal, police offered a A$50,000 reward for information leading to Marinof's whereabouts.

Eight months later, a tip came in that Marinof was staying at a property owned by members of an outlaw motorcycle club near Wallan. Acting on the tip, on 25 February 1986, Detective Sergeant Kapetanovski and his partner, Detective Senior Constable Rodney MacDonald, conducting surveillance on the property, spotted Marinof in a wig and beard getting into and driving from the property in a Queensland-registered Ford Falcon Panel Van. Sergeant Kapetanovski and Senior Constable MacDonald followed the vehicle a short distance before pulling over the vehicle. As the vehicles came to a stop, Marinof produced a firearm and opened fire on Sergeant Kapetanovski and Senior Constable MacDonald, seriously wounded them. Despite being wounded in the chest, Detective Senior Constable MacDonald managed to return fire with his police-issued shotgun, shattering the van's rear window and mortally wounding Marinof.

The vehicle then veered off the road, crashing through a wooden fence into a paddock. When Marinof's vehicle was spotted in the paddock, officers surrounded the vehicle and found Marinof's body in the driver's seat. Both Sergeant Kapetanovski and Senior Constable MacDonald later made a full recovery from their wounds.

The Russell Street bombing on 27 March 1986 and the death of Constable Angela Taylor from her injuries 24 days later, had heighten fears within the Victoria Police that any officer on duty elsewhere could be considered as a target of a criminal attack. Those fears were later justified six months to day of the Russell Street Bombing. In the early hours of 27 September 1986, Senior Constable Maurice Moore was on duty at the Maryborough police station when he left the station to get a bottle of milk from his home. As Moore's patrol car turned onto Brougham Street, he came across two men pushing a stolen vehicle. One of the men quickly fled when he saw Moore's patrol car coming towards them, the other man was quickly detained by Moore. As Moore was taking down the details of the offense, the detained offender, 28-year-old invalid Robert Nowell, overpowered Senior Constable Moore, grabbing Moore's police-issued service revolver and shot Moore five times, killing him. Nowell later gave himself up to police in Ballarat and was later convicted of Moore's murder on 8 September 1987.

This period of the 1980s saw a high number of armed robberies being committed throughout Melbourne to a point where they had become a problem for police forces across Australia. Rather than committing robberies on impulse, professional armed robbers organised in gangs, began planning their robberies in advance by conducting surveillance on targets known to carry large amount of cash, selecting gang members, assigning roles, organising weaponry and equipment needed, arranging the getaway vehicles, and organising safehouses. The armed robbery gangs not only carried out their robberies with precision, they also carried out their robberies with threats of violence.

Prior events

On 11 October 1988, Peirce's best friend, Graeme Jensen, was fatally shot by police in Narre Warren. Jensen had been under observation by the Victoria Police Armed Robbery Squad, who had planned to arrest him in connection with an armed robbery and murder. Police followed Jensen to a local store. Three cars containing eight detectives attempted to block Jensen in as he left the store, but one of the cars was delayed by passing traffic, allowing Jensen to drive through. Police later gave sworn evidence that they saw Jensen brandish a firearm. Police yelled at Jensen to stop, one detective yelled: "He's got a gun." Jensen was then shot dead. His car crashed into a roadside pole.

Report of an abandoned car
On 12 October, 13 hours after Jensen's death, at 4:39am, Constables Tynan and Eyre were operating a divisional van from Prahran police station when called to an abandoned Holden Commodore left in Walsh Street, South Yarra. At the time, the call about the abandoned Commodore would've been answered by police units from St Kilda Road police station, however at the time of the murders, St. Kilda Road police station had a shortage of officers on duty and were unable to send a divisional van. Nominally, the call would've been diverted to units from South Melbourne police station. But on the night, the only available South Melbourne police unit, another divisional van, operated by a female constable and a male constable, had been called to a suspected suicide in St. Kilda. As Constables Tynan and Eyre were the first available officers in the area, the call was passed onto their divisional van. While the officers were examining the vehicle, they were ambushed by armed offenders. Constable Tynan was cut down with a shotgun while sitting in the car, and Constable Eyre was seriously wounded. It is thought that Constable Eyre, despite having suffered serious wounds, struggled with the attacker until another person approached him from behind, managed to remove Eyre's service revolver from its holster and shot him in the head with it. Upon hearing reports from residents on Walsh Street about shots fired, at 4:53am, the police communications officer attempted to contact Tynan and Eyre. Unable to contact Eyre and Tynan, the police communications officer contacted the South Melbourne district supervising inspector.

Police believed members of a Melbourne armed robbery gang had organised the murders. In the period up to April 1989 there had been an unusually high number of fatal shootings of suspects by police. The killings of the two police officers were viewed by many as a form of payback by members of the Melbourne underworld.

Ty-Eyre task force
The police investigation was known as the Ty-Eyre Task Force, a combination of the two surnames of the officers killed. Detective Inspector John Noonan was the Officer in Charge and it was the biggest investigation Victoria Police had ever undertaken at the time and also the longest running, spanning 895 days. At the height of the investigation, police had hundreds of officers working with the task force to investigate the murders.

The Flemington Crew
Police investigations revealed the shotgun used to perform the murders was the same weapon used earlier in a bungled attempt to blast open a bank door during a robbery at the State Bank in Oak Park seven months earlier. A gang, dubbed the Flemington Crew by police, had robbed at least four Melbourne banks. The robbers, on security CCTV at the Oak Park robbery, had left shotgun shells at the scene. Seven months into the investigation, the shotgun itself was found half-buried in an inner-city golf-course plant bed by a gardener. The shotgun and shells became the single forensic link police had, linking the Oak Park robbery to the same shotgun used in the Walsh Street murders. The shotgun and empty shotgun shell casings are on display at the Victoria Police Museum, Melbourne.

Pettingill family

Members of the gangs responsible for the robberies were believed to be Victor Peirce, Graeme Jensen, Jedd Houghton and Peter David McEvoy. The home of Victor Peirce was raided the day following the Walsh Street shootings. Peirce's house was later demolished and the backyard dug up in the search for evidence.

Trial
The trial of the four men accused, Victor Peirce, Trevor Pettingill, Anthony Leigh Farrell and Peter David McEvoy, began in March 1991. The prosecution alleged six people were involved in the planning of the shootings: the accused, Jason Ryan, and the late Jedd Houghton.

Prosecution
Jason Ryan became a prosecution witness in the trial and was offered immunity in exchange for his testimony. Police placed Ryan under the witness protection program and moved him to Mansfield on 24 October 1988 for questioning. His evidence changed a number of times up to the opening of the trial.

Ryan's evidence had implicated Gary Abdallah, Jedd Houghton, Anthony Leigh Farrell and Emmanuel Alexandris. Police were told the party of killers were Jedd Houghton, Peter David McEvoy, Anthony Leigh Farrell and his uncles Victor Peirce and Trevor Pettingill. Houghton was shot and killed during a police raid on the Big4 Ascot Holiday Park in Bendigo in November 1988. Abdallah was fatally wounded during his arrest on another matter in April 1989.

Victor Peirce's wife, Wendy Peirce, also became a prosecution witness and entered the witness protection program. She had previously maintained her husband was with her in a motel all night on the night of the murders; she retracted this alibi in preparation to testify against her husband. But, in a pre-trial hearing, she retracted her retraction and, as a hostile witness, did not appear at the trial.

Not guilty verdict

All four men charged with the murders were acquitted in the Supreme Court of Victoria.

Victor Peirce and Peter David McEvoy were taken back into custody on other charges. Upon receiving the verdict, D24 sent a broadcast of the verdict to every police officer in Melbourne, telling them to keep control and resist from carrying out any acts of retaliation against the defendants.

Wendy Peirce was charged with perjury, convicted and sentenced to serve 9 months non-parole.

Timeline of relevant events
 25 January 1987 – Mark Militano is shot and killed by Victoria Police
 June, 1987 – Frank Valastro is shot and killed by Victoria Police
 11 October 1988 – Graeme Jensen is killed
 12 October 1988, approx. 4:50am – Walsh Street killings occur
 21 October 1988, TyEyre taskforce set up
 24 October 1988 – Jason Ryan moved to Mansfield and placed under witness protection
 17 November 1988 – Jedd Houghton shot and killed by police in a Bendigo caravan park.
 9 April 1989 – Gary Abdallah is shot and killed by Victoria Police after pulling an imitation pistol on detectives.
 26 March 1991 – four accused men found not guilty.
 1 May 2002 – Victor Peirce shot and killed in Bay Street, Port Melbourne in drive-by shooting linked to Andrew "Benji" Veniamin
 October, 2005 – Widow of Victor Peirce, Wendy Peirce gives an interview to John Silvester, detailing her husband's involvement in the crime.
 February, 2010 – Peter McEvoy told New South Wales Police, in anger, that he had heard the final words of a dying constable, prompting calls for a coronial inquest into the deaths of the two policemen.
 13 March 2011 – Sunday Night airs former police officer Malcolm Rosenes' claim that Graeme Jensen was killed in cold blood and had a sawn-off rifle planted in his car after death.
 October, 2011 – The book A Pack of Bloody Animals was published, concluding that two of the defendants, Anthony Farrell and Trevor Pettingill, played no part in the murders of the two policemen.

In popular culture

The Seven Network aired a documentary on the shootings in 2010 titled "Police Under Fire: The Walsh Street Killings". The Walsh Street shootings and the people responsible for them inspired the fictional 2010 feature film Animal Kingdom and the 2011 television docudrama Killing Time. They were also mentioned several times in the 2011 docudrama Underbelly Files: Tell Them Lucifer was Here (which concerned the 1998 Silk–Miller police murders in Melbourne).

The Walsh Street shootings were a subject of the Screen Australia/Film Victoria documentary Trigger Point, aired by the ABC in 2014, which also documented questionable cases of shootings of criminals by police, and training programmes aimed at reducing such incidents. The case was also covered by Casefile True Crime Podcast on 29 July 2017.

See also

 The Stringybark Creek police murders
 Silk–Miller police murders
 Melbourne gangland killings
 Crime in Melbourne
 List of unsolved murders (20th century)

References

External links
 Blue Ribbon Day
 Victoria Police

1988 in Australia
History of Melbourne
Victoria Police
Murder in Melbourne
1980s in Melbourne
1988 murders in Australia
Australian police officers killed in the line of duty